Angelina Sandovich (born 11 September 1999) is a Belarusian female acrobatic gymnast. With partners Julia Kovalenko and Yuliya Ramanenka, Sandovich achieved 5th in the 2014 Acrobatic Gymnastics World Championships.

References

External links

 

1999 births
Living people
Belarusian acrobatic gymnasts
Female acrobatic gymnasts
Place of birth missing (living people)